Bityug-Matryonovka is a rural locality (a selo) and the administrative center of Bityug-Matryonovskoye Rural Settlement, Ertilsky District, Voronezh Oblast, Russia. The population was 533 as of 2010. There are 6 streets.

Geography 
Bityug-Matryonovka is located 25 km northwest of Ertil (the district's administrative centre) by road. Kolodeyevka is the nearest rural locality.

References 

Rural localities in Ertilsky District